Mathieu Béda (born 28 July 1981) is a French former professional footballer who played as a defender.

References

External links
 
 

Living people
1981 births
French footballers
Association football defenders
AS Cannes players
FC Girondins de Bordeaux players
AS Nancy Lorraine players
Sint-Truidense V.V. players
Standard Liège players
1. FC Kaiserslautern players
TSV 1860 Munich players
FC Zürich players
Expatriate footballers in Germany
Bundesliga players
2. Bundesliga players
Ligue 1 players
Swiss Super League players